Four people were killed in violence relating to the Northern Ireland Troubles in the town of Limavady, County Londonderry. All were Protestants, and all were killed by the Provisional Irish Republican Army (PIRA, better known as the IRA). One was a prison officer and one was a Royal Ulster Constabulary (RUC) officer. The other two victims were civilians killed by a van bomb explosion outside the Limavady RUC base on 28 March 1972. They were driving past at the time of the attack.

The Catholic Church of Christ the King in Limavady was also bombed by loyalist paramilitaries in October 1981 as it was nearing completion. 

On 6 December 1982 the INLA detonated a bomb without warning in The Droppin Well Nightclub in Ballykelly just 3 miles from Limavady. The nightclub was Catholic-owned and drew people from all sections of the community including soldiers from the base nearby.
As a result 17 people were murdered, 11 of them being military. Over 30 were injured, some very severely.

In the early hours of 13th Of June 1986 the IRA detonated a huge bomb in Castle Park, a predominantly Protestant residential area of Limavady.
Police were still evacuating homes when the bomb went off but only minor injuries were incurred though about thirty homes were damaged, some of them very significantly.

References 

NI Conflict Archive on the Internet
The Church of Christ the King bombing and its aftermath
The Irish News (7 October 2008)

Limavady
Troubles